Vice Admiral Seth Amoama (born 1959) is the current Chief of Defence Staff (CDS) of the Ghana Armed Forces. He was appointed by President Akufo Addo in January 2021. He replaced Lieutenant General Obed Akwa, who retired at the start of February 2021. Prior to that he was the Chief of Naval Staff of the Ghana Navy appointed since 2019.

Early life and education 
Vice Admiral Seth Amoama, had his secondary school education at Presbyterian Boys' Senior High School. He was enlisted into the Ghana Armed Forces as a Naval Cadet in 1981 and had his initial training at the Ghana Military Academy (GMA). While at GMA, he was sent to the Pakistan Naval Academy on 1 August 1982, to continue with his training and was commissioned into the Executive Branch of the Ghana Navy in December 1984. He was a proud winner of the sword of honour on graduation in Pakistan.

Vice Admiral Amoama's military training and qualifications include; International Sub-Lieutenant Course at Britannia Royal Naval College, Dartmouth, UK. He attended the Ghana Armed Forces Command and Staff Courses both Junior and Senior Divisions at Teshie, Accra and was the best all-round graduate on both courses. He was a member of the Naval Staff Course, Class 53 at US Naval War College, Newport Rhode Island graduating with distinction. He graduated from the Nigerian Defence College in August 2013 as the best all-round graduate.

The Chief of the Defense Staff is an alumnus of the Galilee Institute of Management in Israel and holds a Master of Science Degree in Strategic Studies from the Political Science Department of University of Ibadan, Nigeria.

Career 
He has held numerous appointments in the Ghana Armed Forces both afloat and ashore. He was the Watch Keeping Officer onboard Ghana Navy Ships SEBO, ACHIMOTA and YOGAGA at different times in his career. He also served as Commanding Officer onboard Ghana Navy Ships DZATA (Oct 91 – Feb 94) and ACHIMOTA (Jul 08 – Mar 09).

Between March 2002 and March 2003, the Chief of the Defense Staff served as Directing Staff at the Junior and later Senior Division of the Ghana Armed Forces Command & Staff College. He was later seconded to the United Nations Headquarters as Military Planning Officer at the Department of Peacekeeping Operations from February 2005 to May 2008. Vice Admiral Amoama was the Director of Administration at the Naval Headquarters (1 Apr 09 – 31 Jul 13), Military Assistant to the Chief of the Defence Staff (1 Aug 13 – 31 Jul 14) and later the Chief Staff Officer at the Naval Headquarters (1 August 14 – 28 February 16). He also served as the Flag Officer Commanding, Eastern Naval Command from 1 Mar 16 to Jun 16. Until his appointment as the Chief of the Naval Staff, he was the Commandant of the Ghana Armed Forces Command & Staff College from 1 July 2016 to 3 January 2019.

Vice Admiral Amoama has some peacekeeping experience, having served as UN Military Observer in Rwanda (1995-1996), UN Liaison Officer in Lebanon (1997-1998), and UN Staff Officer in Sierra Leone (2001-2002).

Personal life 
He is married to Victoria with three children. He likes music and flowers.

References 

1967 births
Living people
University of Ibadan alumni
Ghana Navy personnel
Ghanaian military personnel
Chiefs of Naval Staff (Ghana)
Presbyterian Boys' Senior High School alumni